Darreh Deh is a village in Itivand-e Shomali Rural District, Kakavand District, Delfan County, Lorestan Province, Iran. At the 2006 census, its population was 33, in 7 families.

References 

Towns and villages in Delfan County